Mary Loy (née Allitt) OAM (1 November 1925 – 10 December 2013) was an Australian cricketer who captained the national women's team on three occasions in 1963. She played 11 Tests, after making her debut against England in 1951, making a top score of 76. She also played for New South Wales.

On 23 August 2000, Allitt was awarded the Australian Sports Medal and on 1 January 2001, she was awarded the Centenary Medal for her contribution to cricket. Under her married name of Mary Loy she was awarded the Medal of the Order of Australia in June 2007 in recognition of her lifelong commitment to the game. Allitt died in December 2013, and was described as a "trailblazer" and "pioneer of women's cricket" in a Cricket Australia obituary.

References

External links
 Stoic Opener: Mary Allitt – Talkin' About Women's Cricket profile

1925 births
2013 deaths
Australia women Test cricketers
Members of the Order of Australia
People from Deniliquin
Recipients of the Medal of the Order of Australia
Recipients of the Centenary Medal
Recipients of the Australian Sports Medal
Cricketers from New South Wales
Sportswomen from New South Wales
New South Wales Breakers cricketers